Joshua A. Garcia (born February 28, 1986)  is an American politician from Holyoke, Massachusetts. He was elected Mayor of Holyoke in 2021, and is the first Latino to serve as mayor of Holyoke.

Early life and education
Born and raised in Holyoke, Massachusetts, Garcia received a Master's in Public Administration from Westfield State University and worked for the Holyoke Housing Authority and Pioneer Valley Planning Commission. His mother and grandmother came to the United States from Puerto Rico.

Career 
Before being elected as mayor, Garcia served as town administrator in Blandford, Massachusetts and as a fire commissioner, and school committee member in Holyoke. He became the first Latino to be elected mayor of Holyoke.

Mayoral tenure
Although Garcia's term as mayor officially starts in January 2022, starting on November 15, 2021, Garcia served the remainder of acting mayor Terence Murphy's term.

Among early key priorities, Garcia has pushed for improved management practices, citing during his campaign his prior experience as a town administrator. Testifying before the Commonwealth's municipal finance oversight board, Garcia stated he intended to draft a longterm capital plan for the city, seeking to strengthen internal controls, and work toward eliminating structural deficits to make it less reliant on bonding.

Personal life
Garcia has served as a member of the board of directors on the Holyoke Community College Foundation, as well as the Public Health Institute of Western Massachusetts, since 2018. In 2015 Garcia was named in BusinessWest's "40 Under 40" for his work with the Pioneer Valley Planning Commission.

References

Massachusetts Democrats
American politicians of Puerto Rican descent
Hispanic and Latino American mayors
People from Holyoke, Massachusetts
Mayors of Holyoke, Massachusetts
Massachusetts city managers
1986 births
Living people